Brazil competed at the 2022 World Aquatics Championships in Budapest, Hungary from 17 June to 3 July 2022.

Medalists

Artistic swimming

Women

Mixed

Diving

Men

Women

Mixed

Open water swimming

Men

Women

Mixed

Swimming

Men

Women

Mixed

Water polo

Summary

Men's tournament

Team roster

Group play

13–15th place semifinal

Women's tournament

Team roster

Group play

13–16th place semifinal

13th place game

References

Nations at the 2022 World Aquatics Championships
Brazil at the World Aquatics Championships
World Aquatics Championships